Pilgrim Pictures is the name of two production companies, one from the mid 20th century and one from the 21st century.

Mid 20th century
Chance of a Lifetime (1950)
Private Angelo (1949) 
The Guinea Pig (1948) 
Damaged Hearts (1924)

Late 20th century
The Pilgrims (2009) 
Driven (1994) (TV)

External links
IMDB entry for Pilgrim Pictures

Film production companies of the United Kingdom